Ian Richard Hargreaves CBE (born 18 June 1951 in Burnley) is Professor Emeritus (formerly Prof Digital Economy) at Cardiff University, Wales, UK.

Career
His career in British journalism includes several beats at the Financial Times, as well as Directorship of BBC News & Current Affairs, Editorship of The Independent, and  Editorship of the New Statesman.

In October 2010 he was invited to head an independent commission to consider "how the Intellectual Property framework supports growth and innovation" by the UK Prime Minister David Cameron. The resulting report was published in May 2011. The government declared its intention to implement the review's findings, which include a more flexible approach to copyright, in August 2011.

Hargreaves was appointed Commander of the Order of the British Empire (CBE) in the 2012 Birthday Honours for services to the creative economy and higher education.

In 2015, he became a co-founder of Creative Cardiff, with Justin Lewis.

Personal life
He attended Burnley Grammar School in Burnley and Altrincham Grammar School for Boys. He was educated at Queens' College, Cambridge, where he read English with French. He married Elizabeth Crago in 1972. They divorced in 1991 and have a son (born 1975) and a daughter (born 1977). In 1993 he married Adele Blakebrough, CEO of the Social Business Trust  and they have two daughters (born in January 1997 and May 1998).

Bibliography

 2003 Journalism: Truth or Dare? Oxford University Press.
 2005 Journalism - A very short Introduction, Oxford University Press

References

See also
 Independent review of intellectual property and growth website
 Cardiff Centre for Journalism Studies website
 Moral Maze bio
 Community Action Network website

1951 births
BBC executives
BBC Board members
British male journalists
Academics of Cardiff University
Living people
People from Burnley
People educated at Burnley Grammar School
Alumni of Queens' College, Cambridge
Commanders of the Order of the British Empire
The Independent editors
Financial Times people
People educated at Altrincham Grammar School for Boys
New Statesman people